Marie-Louise Haumont (1919 – February 7, 2012) was a Belgian writer.
She won the 1976 Prix Femina, for her novel, Le Trajet.

Life
She was an editor for the paper Combat in Paris during World War II.

Works
Comme ou la journée de Madame Pline, Paris, NFR, Gallimard, 1974
Le Trajet, Paris, NFR, Gallimard, 1976, Prix Femina
L'Éponge, Paris, NFR, Gallimard, 1981

References

External links
"Marie-Louise Haumont", French wikipedia

1919 births
Prix Femina winners
2012 deaths
20th-century Belgian novelists
Belgian women novelists
20th-century Belgian women writers
Belgian expatriates in France